Hamgin Rural District is a rural district (dehestan) in the Central District of Dehaqan County, Isfahan Province, Iran. At the 2006 census, its population was 4,695, in 1,228 families.  The rural district has 4 villages.

References 

Rural Districts of Isfahan Province
Dehaqan County